Ilvir Ildarovich Huzin (born 14 June 1990) is a Russian bobsledder.

Career
Huzin competed at the 2014 Winter Olympics for Russia. He teamed with driver Alexander Kasjanov, Maxim Belugin and Aleksei Pushkarev as the Russia-2 sled in the four-man event, finishing fourth, missing out on the bronze medal position by three-hundredths of a second.

As of April 2014, his best showing at the World Championships is 11th, coming in the four-man event in 2012.

Huzin made his World Cup debut in November 2012. As of April 2014, he has three World Cup podium finishes, with the best a silver medal at Whistler in 2012-13.

On November 29, 2017, he was disqualified for doping.

World Cup Podiums

References

1990 births
Living people
Olympic bobsledders of Russia
People from Neftekamsk
Bobsledders at the 2014 Winter Olympics
Russian male bobsledders
Russian sportspeople in doping cases
Doping cases in bobsleigh
Sportspeople from Bashkortostan